The Karachays or Karachai  ( or таулула,  'Mountaineers') are an indigenous Caucasian-Turkic ethnic group native to the North Caucasus. They are primarily located in their ancestral lands in the Karachay–Cherkess Republic, a republic of Russia in the North Caucasus.

History
Karachays are among the most ancient ethnic groups of the Caucasus with research showing their connection to the pre-historic Koban culture. A recent genetic study states the following: "Balkars and Karachays belong to the Caucasian anthropological type. According to the results of craniology, somatology, odontology, and dermatoglyphics, the native (Caucasian) origin of the Balkars and Karachays and their kinship with the representatives of neighboring ethnic groups and a minor role of the Central Asian component in their ethnogenesis were concluded."

The state of Alania was established prior to the Mongol invasions and had its capital in Maghas, which some authors locate in Arkhyz, the mountains currently inhabited by the Karachay, while others place it in either what is now modern Ingushetia or North Ossetia. In the 14th century, Alania was destroyed by Timur and the decimated population dispersed into the mountains. Timur's incursion into the North Caucasus introduced the local nations to Islam.

In the nineteenth century Russia took over the area during the Russian conquest of the Caucasus. On October 20, 1828 the  took place, in which the Russian troops were under the command of General Georgy Emanuel.

After annexation, the self-government of Karachay was left intact, including its officials and courts. Interactions with neighboring Muslim peoples continued to take place based on both folk customs and Sharia law. In Karachay, soldiers were taken from Karachai Amanat, pledged an oath of loyalty, and were assigned arms.

From 1831 to 1860, the Karachays were divided. A large portion of Karachays joined the anti-Russian struggles carried out by the North Caucasian peoples; while another significant portion of Karachays, due to being encouraged by the Volga Tatars and Bashkirs, another fellow Turkic Muslim peoples that have long loyal to Russia, voluntarily cooperated with Russian authorities in the Caucasian War.  Between 1861 and 1880, to escape reprisals by the Russian army, some of the Karachays migrated to Turkey although the main part of Karachays still remain in modern territory. 

All Karachay officials were purged by early 1938, and the entire nation was administered by NKVD officers, none of whom were Karachay. In addition, the entire intelligentsia, all rural officials and at least 8,000 ordinary farmers were arrested, including 875 women. Most were executed, but many were sent to prison camps throughout the Caucasus.

During the parade of sovereignties and the collapse of the USSR on November 30, 1990, KCHAO withdrew from the Stavropol Territory and became the Karachay-Cherkess Soviet Socialist Republic (KChSSR) as part of the RSFSR, which was approved by a resolution of the Supreme Council of the RSFSR on July 3, 1991.

In 1989-1997, the Karachay national movements appealed to the leadership of the RSFSR with a request to restore a separate autonomy of Karachay.

On November 18, 1990, at the congress of Karachay deputies of all levels, the Karachay Soviet Socialist Republic (since October 17, 1991 — the Karachay Republic) was proclaimed as part of the RSFSR, which was not recognized by the leadership of the RSFSR. On March 28, 1992, a referendum was held in which, according to the official results, the majority of the population of Karachay-Cherkessia opposed the division. The division was not legalized, and a single Karachay-Cherkessia remained.

Deportation

In 1942 the Germans permitted the establishment of a Karachay National Committee to administer their "autonomous region"; the Karachays were also allowed to form their own police force and establish a brigade that was to fight with the Wehrmacht. This relationship with Nazi Germany resulted, when the Russians regained control of the region in November 1943, with the Karachays being charged with collaboration with Nazi Germany and deported.  Originally restricted only to family members of rebel bandits during World War II, the deportation was later expanded to include the entire Karachay ethnic group. The Soviet government refused to acknowledge that 20,000 Karachays served in the Red Army, greatly outnumbering the 3,000 estimated to have collaborated with the German soldiers. Karachays were forcibly deported and resettled in Central Asia, mostly in Kazakhstan and Kirghizia. In the first two years of the deportations, disease and famine caused the death of 35% of the population; of 28,000 children, 78%, or almost 22,000 perished.

Diaspora
Many Karachays migrated to Turkey after the Russian annexation of the Karachay nation in the early 19th century. Karachays were also forcibly displaced to the Central Asian republics of Uzbekistan, Kazakhstan and Kirghizia during Joseph Stalin's relocation campaign in 1944. Since the Nikita Khrushchev era in the Soviet Union, the majority of Karachays have been repatriated to their homeland from Central Asia. Today, there are sizable Karachay communities in Turkey (centered on Afyonkarahisar), Uzbekistan, the United States, and Germany.

Geography
The Karachay nation, along with the Balkars occupy the valleys and foothills of the Central Caucasus in the river valleys of the Kuban, Big Zelenchuk River, Malka, Baksan, Cherek and others.

The Karachays are very proud of the symbol of their nation, Mount Elbrus, the highest mountain in Europe, with an altitude of 5,642 meters.

Culture
Like other peoples in the mountainous Caucasus, the relative isolation of the Karachay allowed them to develop their particular cultural practices, despite general accommodation with surrounding groups.

Karachay people live in communities that are divided into families and clans (tukums). A tukum is based on a family's lineage and there are roughly thirty-two Karachay tukums. Prominent tukums include: Abayhan, Aci, Batcha (Batca), Baychora, Bayrimuk (Bayramuk), Bostan, Catto (Jatto), Cosar (Çese), Duda, Hubey (Hubi), Karabash, Laypan, Lepshoq, Ozden (Uzden), Silpagar, Tebu, Teke, Toturkul, Urus.

Language
Karachays speak the Karachay-Balkar language, which comes from the northwestern branch of Turkic languages. The Kumyks, who live in northeast Dagestan, speak a closely related language, the Kumyk language.

Religion 
The Karachays are considered deeply religious. The majority of the Karachay are followers of Islam. Some Karachays began adopting Islam in the seventeenth century due to contact with the Nogais and Crimean Tatars and more under the later influence of the Circassians. The Sufi Qadiriya order has a presence in the region.

See also
Karachay horse
Balkars
Balkar and Karachay nationalism
Deportation of the Karachays

References

External links
American Karachai Benevolent Association
I. Miziev. The history of Karachays from ancient times.

Turkic peoples of Europe
Ethnic groups in Russia
Ethnic groups in Turkey
Ethnic groups in Kazakhstan
Karachay-Cherkessia
Peoples of the Caucasus
Muslim communities of Russia
Muslim communities of the Caucasus